Lego Speed Racer is a 2008 Lego theme based on the 2008 film Speed Racer (which is based on the anime of the same name). It consists of four sets which were first released in April 2008. The product line was discontinued by the end of 2009.

Construction sets
According to Bricklink, The Lego Group released 4 playsets based on the Lego Speed Racer theme. It was discontinued by the end of 2009.

Speed Racer & Snake Oiler is a 242-piece set. It features the Mach 5 supercar and Oiler's orange race car, both around 17 cm (6.5") long, and two minifigures: Speed Racer, wearing a blue pullover, and Snake Oiler. 'Racer X & Taejo Togokhan' is a 237-piece set. It features a red and black racecar, a yellow and black race car, both around 16 cm (6") long, and two minifigures: Racer X and Taejo Togokahn, wearing a white suit. Cruncher Block & Racer X is a 367-piece set. It features the same yellow and black race car from the 'Racer X & Taejo Togokhan' set, a 33 cm (13") semi truck and four minifigures – Racer X, Cruncher Block, Cruncher's driver, and Taejo Togokahn. Grand Prix Race is a 595-piece set. It features the Mach 6 racecar, a black and yellow racecar, a black and grey race car, a commentators box, a car workshop, and seven minifigures: Speed Racer wearing white racing coveralls, Gray Ghost, Cannonball Taylor, Pops Racer, Spritle, Trixie, and a commentator.

History
In January 2008 it was announced that The Lego Group had acquired the rights from Warner Bros. to produce four sets based on the upcoming Speed Racer film. Lego has previously partnered with Warner Bros., creating Batman and Harry Potter themes. The Speed Racer theme was released under the Lego Racers brand.

The four sets were first released in the United States on April 3, 2008. In the United Kingdom the sets Speed Racer & Snake Oiler, Racer X & Taejo Togokhan, and Grand Prix Race were released on April 6, 2008, while Cruncher Block & Racer X was released later at the start of May.

In other media
The Speed Racer product line briefly appeared in the 2014 film The Lego Movie as one of the many lesser Lego worlds described by Wildstyle.

Reception
Animetion.co.uk rated the set 'Speed Racer & Snake Oiler' (8158) four out of five, stating the set is "great fun to build and are good enough to display or play". They however criticized the use of stickers due to the large margin of error when applying them to the bricks and that one sticker covers three bricks, which could lead to problems when deconstructing the set.

See also
 Lego City
 Lego Cars
 Lego Fusion
 Lego Speed Champions
 Lego World Racers
 Lego Racers

References

Lego themes
Speed Racer
2000s toys
Products introduced in 2008